The Asian Matchplay Championship was a professional match play golf tournament. It was the season ending event in each of the first four seasons of the Omega Tour, now known as the Asian Tour. It also included a pairs competition, the Hugo Boss Foursomes, played using the alternate shot format.

It was hosted at a different venue every season. After the inaugural event, which was played in January, it was held in December each season. The tournament was sponsored by Volvo between 1996 and 1998, when it was titled as the Volvo Asian Matchplay.

The limited field was predominantly made up of winners of the major tournaments on the Omega Tour and leading players from the Order of Merit that season, with invitations also issued to the leading players from the Asia Golf Circuit, Japan Golf Tour, PGA Tour of Australasia and Southern Africa Tour.

Winners

Notes

References

Former Asian Tour events
Golf tournaments in China
Golf tournaments in Indonesia
Golf tournaments in the Philippines
Recurring sporting events established in 1995
Recurring sporting events disestablished in 1998